Eric Johann Johnson (born August 7, 1979) is a Canadian actor known for playing Flash Gordon on the eponymous 2007–2008 television series, Whitney Fordman on the superhero series Smallville, Detective Luke Callaghan on the police drama Rookie Blue, and Jack Hyde in the Fifty Shades film series. Since 2022, he has played a misogynist corrupt sheriff in the HBO Max horror series Pretty Little Liars: Original Sin.

Career
Johnson began his career acting at the age of nine, when his parents enrolled him in Stage Polaris, a theater company in Edmonton. Johnson played the younger version of Brad Pitt's character in 1994 film Legends of the Fall. In Canada, Johnson was the lead in an award-winning film titled Scorn. His break-out role came in 2001, as football jock and Clark Kent rival Whitney Fordman in Smallville.

In 2004, Johnson played the anti-Mormon son, Joshua Steed, in The Work and the Glory and later its sequels. A few years later, he played the title role in the television revival of Flash Gordon that debuted on Sci Fi in August 2007; the series was cancelled after one season. On November 27, 2010, Johnson starred as Jake Finley in the Hallmark movie, Debbie Macomber's Call Me Mrs. Miracle. He also portrayed Luke Callahan in the Canadian police drama Rookie Blue and inmate Cal Sweeney, a bank robber, in the Fox series Alcatraz. In 2012, Johnson was cast as the voice actor and physical actor of Sam Fisher in Splinter Cell: Blacklist, replacing Michael Ironside, who voiced the character in previous installments.

In 2013, Johnson was cast in Cinemax's original medical drama The Knick as a racist, but talented, young medic who is Clive Owen's protege; the series was directed by Steven Soderbergh.

Johnson played villain Jack Hyde in the drama sequels Fifty Shades Darker (2017) and Fifty Shades Freed (2018).

Personal life
Johnson was born in Edmonton, Alberta. His father, Fred, managed a binding corporation, and his mother, Jane, is a librarian, massage therapist, and music teacher. In 2004, Johnson married writer-producer Adria Budd, whom he met on the set of Smallville, as she was Annette O'Toole's and John Glover's personal assistant. They have a child born in 2007.

Filmography

Film

Television

Video games

References

External links
 

1979 births
Canadian male film actors
Canadian male television actors
Canadian male voice actors
Living people
Male actors from Edmonton
20th-century Canadian male actors
21st-century Canadian male actors